Frederick Tuta (1269 – 16 August 1291), a member of the House of Wettin, was Margrave of Landsberg from 1285 and Margrave of Lusatia from 1288 until his death. He also served as regent of the Margraviate of Meissen.

The origin and meaning of his nickname Tuta are unclear and were not recorded. It possibly means "the Stammerer".

Life
Frederick was the only son of the Wettin margrave Theodoric of Landsberg and Helene, a daughter of Margrave John I of Brandenburg; he thereby was a grandson of Margrave Henry III of Meissen. Upon his father's early death in 1285, he succeeded him in the Margraviate of Landsberg, then comprising the bulk of the Osterland territory with Leipzig, Grimma, and the margravial residence of Weißenfels.

When his grandfather Margrave Henry III died in 1288, Frederick Tuta entered into an inheritance conflict with his uncle 
Albert the Degenerate around the Margraviates of Meissen and Lusatia. While Albert succeeded his father as Margrave of Meissen, Frederick inherited the Lusatian march. However, Albert's sons Frederick the Bitten and Theodoric IV disputed this arrangement and Frederick's rule in Lusatia within short time was contested by his cousin Theodoric IV.  

In turn, Frederick Tuta concentrated on expanding his power into the Meissen lands where Margrave Albert's rule was shaken by a fierce dispute with his sons. Temporarily arrested by Frederick the Bitten, Albert had to renounce large parts of his estates and in 1289 Frederick Tuta, with the support of several local nobles, was able to purchase a significant Meissen territory. He also acquired several estates around Dresden from his uncle Frederick Clem, the youngest son of late Margrave Henry III.

However, Frederick's sudden death put an end to his ambitions, when he died on 16 August 1291, aged 22, at Hirschstein Castle – allegedly due to eating poisoned cherries offered to him by Bishop Withego of Meissen. As he did not have a male heir, his possessions were divided after his death. His cousins Frederick the Bitten and Theodoric IV took Meissen and Lusatia; while the Margraviate of Landsberg was sold to the Ascanian margraves of Brandenburg.

Marriage and issue
Frederick married Catherine (d. 1310), a daughter of the Wittelsbach duke Henry XIII of Bavaria. They had one daughter, Elisabeth.

Ancestors

References

Margraves of Lusatia
Margraves of Meissen
House of Wettin
13th-century German nobility
1269 births
1291 deaths